Nikola Ćirić and Goran Tošić were the defending champions, but chose not to compete this year.
The top two seeds competed for the title, where Marin Draganja and Mate Pavić defeated Aljaž Bedene and Jaroslav Pospíšil 7–5, 4–6, [10–6]

Seeds

Draw

Draw

References
 Main Draw

ATP Challenger Trophy - Doubles
2013 Doubles